Saint-Ludger-de-Milot is a municipality in Quebec, Canada.

Demographics
Population trend:
 Population in 2011: 678 (2006 to 2011 population change: -6.7%)
 Population in 2006: 727
 Population in 2001: 764
 Population in 1996: 752
 Population in 1991: 721

Private dwellings occupied by usual residents: 306 (total dwellings: 467)

Mother tongue:
 English as first language: 0%
 French as first language: 100%
 English and French as first language: 0%
 Other as first language: 0%

See also
 List of municipalities in Quebec

References

Municipalities in Quebec
Incorporated places in Saguenay–Lac-Saint-Jean